Melvin "Half Pint" "Lefty" Allen was an American baseball pitcher in the Negro leagues. He played with the Baltimore Black Sox in 1932 and 1934.

External links
  Seamheads

Baltimore Black Sox players
Year of birth unknown
Year of death unknown
Baseball pitchers